In mathematics and computer science, in the field of coding theory, the Hamming bound is a limit on the parameters of an arbitrary block code: it is also known as the sphere-packing bound or the volume bound from an interpretation in terms of packing balls in the Hamming metric into the space of all possible words.  It gives an important limitation on the efficiency with which any error-correcting code can utilize the space in which its code words are embedded. A code that attains the Hamming bound is said to be a perfect code.

Background on error-correcting codes

An original message and an encoded version are both composed in an alphabet of q letters. Each code word contains n letters. The original message (of length m) is shorter than n letters. The message is converted into an n-letter codeword by an encoding algorithm, transmitted over a noisy channel, and finally decoded by the receiver. The decoding process interprets a garbled codeword, referred to as simply a word, as the valid codeword "nearest" the n-letter received string.

Mathematically, there are exactly qm possible messages of length m, and each message can be regarded as a vector of length m. The encoding scheme converts an m-dimensional vector into an n-dimensional vector. Exactly qm valid codewords are possible, but any one of qn words can be received because the noisy channel might distort one or more of the n letters when a codeword is transmitted.

Statement of the bound

Preliminary definitions
An alphabet set  is a set of symbols with  elements. The set of strings of length  on the alphabet set  are denoted . (There are  distinct strings in this set of strings.) (The choice of alphabet set  makes no difference to the result, provided the alphabet is of size ; for example, any block code defined using the alphabet  can be converted to one using the alphabet  by a simple substitution cipher and vice versa. More than one such substitution cipher is possible, but the differences are irrelevant to the bound and its proof.)

Defining the bound
Let  denote the maximum possible size of a -ary block code  of length  and minimum Hamming distance  between elements of the block code (necessarily positive for ).

Then, the Hamming bound is:

where

Proof
It follows from the definition of  that if at most 
 
errors are made during transmission of a codeword then minimum distance decoding will decode it correctly (i.e., it decodes the received word as the codeword that was sent). Thus the code is said to be capable of correcting  errors.

Every pair of these balls (Hamming spheres) are non-intersecting by the -error-correcting property. Let  be the number of words in each ball (in other words, the volume of the ball). A word that is in such a ball can deviate in at most  components from those of the ball's centre, which is a codeword. Thus,

Whence:

Covering radius and packing radius

 s ≤ t and t ≤ r.
Therefore, s ≤ r and if equality holds then s = r = t. The case of equality means that the Hamming bound is attained.

Perfect codes 
Codes that attain the Hamming bound are called perfect codes. Another example is given by the repeat codes, where each symbol of the message is repeated an odd fixed number of times to obtain a codeword where q = 2. All of these examples are often called the trivial perfect codes.
In 1973, Tietäväinen proved that any non-trivial perfect code over a prime-power alphabet has the parameters of a Hamming code or a Golay code.

A perfect code may be interpreted as one in which the balls of Hamming radius t centered on codewords exactly fill out the space (t is the covering radius = packing radius).  A quasi-perfect code is one in which the balls of Hamming radius t centered on codewords are disjoint and the balls of radius t+1 cover the space, possibly with some overlaps. Another way to say this is that a code is quasi-perfect if its covering radius is one greater than its packing radius.

See also

Griesmer bound
Singleton bound
Gilbert-Varshamov bound
Plotkin bound
Johnson bound
Rate-distortion theory

Notes

References 
 
 
 
 
 
 
 
 

Coding theory